SEC23-interacting protein is a protein that in humans is encoded by the SEC23IP gene.

COPII-coated vesicles are involved in protein transport from the Endoplasmic Reticulum to the Golgi Apparatus. The protein encoded by this gene was identified by its interaction with a mouse protein similar to yeast Sec23p, an essential component of the COPII. This protein shares significant similarity with phospholipid-modifying proteins, especially phosphatidic acid preferring-phospholipase A1. Overexpression of this protein has been shown to cause disorganization of the endoplasmic reticulum-Golgi intermediate compartment and Golgi apparatus, which suggests its role in the early secretory pathway.

References

Further reading